Rockwell is a town in Rowan County, North Carolina, United States. The population was 2,302 at the 2020 census.

History
The George Matthias Bernhardt House, Grace Evangelical and Reformed Church, and Zion Lutheran Church are listed on the National Register of Historic Places.

Geography
Rockwell is located at  (35.553067, -80.407963).

Demographics

2020 census

As of the 2020 United States census, there were 2,302 people, 769 households, and 556 families residing in the town.

2000 census
As of the census of 2000, there were 1,971 people, 744 households, and 552 families residing in the town. The population density was 1,183.8 people per square mile (458.4/km). There were 781 housing units at an average density of 469.1 per square mile (181.7/km). The racial makeup of the town was 97.21% White, 0.71% African American, 0.05% Native American, 0.56% Asian, 0.76% from other races, and 0.71% from two or more races. Hispanic or Latino of any race were 1.57% of the population.

There were 744 households, out of which 35.5% had children under the age of 18 living with them, 59.8% were married couples living together, 10.5% had a female householder with no husband present, and 25.7% were non-families. 23.3% of all households were made up of individuals, and 11.8% had someone living alone who was 65 years of age or older. The average household size was 2.52 and the average family size was 2.96.

In the town, the population was spread out, with 25.6% under the age of 18, 7.7% from 18 to 24, 28.4% from 25 to 44, 20.6% from 45 to 64, and 17.7% who were 65 years of age or older. The median age was 38 years. For every 100 females, there were 87.9 males. For every 100 females age 18 and over, there were 83.8 males.

The median income for a household in the town was $41,488, and the median income for a family was $47,935. Males had a median income of $31,763 versus $23,304 for females. The per capita income for the town was $19,687. About 3.6% of families and 4.6% of the population were below the poverty line, including 4.4% of those under age 18 and 9.1% of those age 65 or over.

Education
Rockwell Elementary School- Rockets-
Rockwell Christian School- 
Shive Elementary School-
Grace Academy

Rockwell Elementary School, formerly known as Rockwell School, was built in 1928.  It combined a total of eighteen one and two room school houses within the eastern part of Rowan County.  Until 1959, Rockwell School housed grades 1-12.  Beginning in 1959, Rockwell housed grades 1–6.  In 1973, Kindergarten was added and made Rockwell a K-6 school.  In 1990, Rowan County changed all of the elementary schools to K-5 and this configuration is still in place today.

Library

The East Branch of the Rowan Public Library (whose main facility is in Salisbury) is located in Rockwell.

Places of worship

 Bethel Baptist Church
 First Baptist Church of Rockwell
 God's Tabernacle for Believers
 Grace Bible Church
 Grace Lowerstone Church
 Hillcreek Worship Center
 Immanuel Lutheran Church
 Living Large Ministries
 Lyerly Evangelical Church
 Ministries of Living Waters
 New Haven Baptist Church
 Organ Lutheran Church
 Rockwell Church of God
 Rockwell United Methodist
 St. James Lutheran
 St. Mathews Baptist Church
 Restoration Church 
 Ursinus United Church of Christ
 West Park Baptist

References

Towns in Rowan County, North Carolina
Towns in North Carolina
Populated places established in 1895
1895 establishments in North Carolina